Neola may refer to:

Places in the United States
 Neola, Iowa in Pottawattamie County
 Neola, Pennsylvania in Monroe County
 Neola, Utah in Duchesne County
 Neola, West Virginia in Greenbrier County

Other
 Neola (moth), a genus of moths in the family Notodontidae
 Neola, a stringed experimental musical instrument invented in 1970